The government of María Chivite was formed on 7 August 2019, following the latter's election as President of the Government of Navarre by the Parliament of Navarre on 2 August and her swearing-in on 6 August, as a result of the Socialist Party of Navarre (PSN–PSOE) being able to muster a majority of seats in the Parliament together with Geroa Bai (GBai) and Podemos, with external support from EH Bildu and Izquierda-Ezkerra (I–E), following the 2019 Navarrese regional election.

The cabinet comprises members of the PSN–PSOE, GBai—with the involvement of the Basque Nationalist Party (EAJ/PNV) and, from September 2020, also Future Social Greens (GSB/GSV)—and Podemos, as well as a number of independents proposed by the first two parties.

Investiture

Cabinet changes
Chivite's government saw a number of cabinet changes during its tenure:
On 29 January 2021, Minister of Economic and Business Development Manuel Ayerdi resigned after being accused of embezzlement by the Supreme Court of Spain in the "Davalor case", the alleged irregular grant of 2.6 million euros to a company that was in crisis in the 2015–2017 period. Mikel Irujo was appointed to replace Ayerdi in his post.

Council of Government
The Council of Government is structured into the offices for the president, the two vice presidents and 13 ministries.

Departmental structure
María Chivite's government is organised into several superior and governing units, whose number, powers and hierarchical structure may vary depending on the ministerial department.

Unit/body rank
() Director-general
() Service

Notelist

References

2019 establishments in Navarre
Cabinets established in 2019
Cabinets of Navarre
Current governments